Aleksandr Shatskikh (21 January 1974 – 30 November 2020) was a Kazakh footballer who played as a striker.

Career
Born in Taldıqorğan, Shatskikh played club football for Zhetysu / Taldykorgan, Qaynar, Chkalovets, Astana Aqmola / Zhenis Astana, Irtysh Pavlodar, CSKA-Qayrat Almaty, Esil Bogatyr, Megasport and Lokomotiv Astana.

He earned one cap for the Kazakhstan national team in 2003.

He died on 30 November 2020, aged 46.

References

1974 births
2020 deaths
Kazakhstani footballers
Kazakhstan international footballers
FC Zhetysu players
FC Sibir Novosibirsk players
FC Zhenis Astana players
Place of death missing
FC Irtysh Pavlodar players
FC Kyzylzhar players
FC Megasport players
FC Astana players
Association football forwards